This article presents a list of the historical events and publications of Australian literature during 1971.

Major publications

Books 
 Jon Cleary – Mask of the Andes
 Kenneth Cook – Piper in the Market-Place
 Dymphna Cusack – A Bough in Hell
 Frank Hardy – The Outcasts of Foolgarah
 Donald Horne – But What If There Are No Pelicans?
 David Ireland – The Unknown Industrial Prisoner
 George Johnston – A Cartload of Clay
 Thomas Keneally – A Dutiful Daughter
 Hal Porter – The Right Thing
 Judah Waten – So Far No Further
 Morris West – Summer of the Red Wolf

Short stories 
 Elizabeth Jolley – "Bill Sprockett's Land"
 Hal Porter
 "Brett"
 Selected Stories

Children's and Young Adult fiction 
 Hesba Brinsmead – Longtime Passing
 David Martin – Hughie
 Christobel Mattingley – Windmill at Magpie Creek
 Elyne Mitchell – Light Horse to Damascus
 Ivan Southall – Josh
 P. L. Travers – Friend Monkey

Science fiction and fantasy
 John Baxter – The Second Pacific Book of Science Fiction
 A. Bertram Chandler
 Alternate Orbits
 To Prime the Pump
 Lindsay Gutteridge – Cold War in a Country Garden
 Lee Harding – "Fallen Spaceman"
 Jack Wodhams – The Authentic Touch

Poetry 

 Robert Adamson – The Rumour
 Bruce Dawe – Condolences of the Season : Selected Poems
 Gwen Harwood – "Oyster Cove"
 A. D. Hope – "Inscription for a War"
 James McAuley – Collected Poems 1936-1970
 Dorothea Mackellar – The Poems of Dorothea Mackellar
 Geoff Page – "Smalltown Memorials"
 David Rowbotham – The Pen of Feathers : Poems
 T. G. H. Strehlow – Songs of Central Australia (edited)
 Chris Wallace-Crabbe
 "Other People"
 Where the Wind Came : poems
 Judith Wright – Collected Poems, 1942-1970

Drama 
 Alex Buzo – Macquarie : A Play
 Dorothy Hewett - The Chapel Perilous
 Ray Lawler – The Man Who Shot the Albatross
 David Williamson
 Don's Party
 The Removalists

Awards and honours

Literary

Children and Young Adult

Poetry

Births 
A list, ordered by date of birth (and, if the date is either unspecified or repeated, ordered alphabetically by surname) of births in 1971 of Australian literary figures, authors of written works or literature-related individuals follows, including year of death.

Unknown date
 Libby Hart, poet
 James Ley, literary critic and founder of the Sydney Review of Books
 John Mateer, poet and author
 Leigh Redhead, novelist

Deaths 
A list, ordered by date of death (and, if the date is either unspecified or repeated, ordered alphabetically by surname) of deaths in 1971 of Australian literary figures, authors of written works or literature-related individuals follows, including year of birth.

 3 February – Richard Harry Graves, poet and novelist (born 1897)
 30 June – Kenneth Slessor, poet (born 1901)
11 September – Hilda Bridges, novelist and short story writer (born 1881)

See also 
 1971 in literature
 1971 in poetry
 List of years in literature
 List of years in Australian literature
 1971 in literature
1970 in Australian literature
1971 in Australia
1972 in Australian literature

References

 
Australian literature by year
20th-century Australian literature
1971 in literature